

History
Built by the John Fowler plant at Leeds in England in 1923, it was used at the Kiama Quarries for blue metal haulage at the town of Kiama until 1941 when the quarry was shutdown.

Demise and Preservation
After the Quarry had closed this locomotive was used by a variety of preservation groups until donated to the Illawarra Light Railway Museum on 28 August 1998 and is now awaiting restoration.

References

Further reading
 

2 ft gauge locomotives
0-4-0 locomotives
Kiama Fowler
Fowler locomotives